A constitutional referendum was held in Egypt on 26 March 2007. The amendments to the constitution were mostly concerning electoral law, and had been passed by Parliament on 20 March 2007. Government critics accused President Hosni Mubarak of deliberately having hastened the schedule (the referendum had originally been expected on 4 April 2007) in order to make it impossible for them to organise a strong "no" campaign.

According to official results, 75.9 per cent of voters were in favour of the reforms, with an official turnout of 27.1 per cent. Government critics claimed the turnout was actually around 5 per cent.

Results

References

Referendums in Egypt
2007 in Egypt
2007 referendums
Constitutional referendums in Egypt
March 2007 events in Africa